These are the Polish number one albums of 2011, per the OLiS Chart.

Chart history

See also 
 List of number-one singles of 2011 (Poland)

References 

Number-one albums
Poland
2011